Amy Bach (born 1968) is an American a journalist, attorney, and author of Ordinary Injustice: How America Holds Court, for which she won the 2010 Robert F. Kennedy Book Award. She is the Founder and Executive Director of Measures for Justice, a nonprofit that collects and publishes county-level criminal justice performance data. She founded the organization after she published her book.

Background and education 
Bach grew up in New York City, where she graduated from Chapin School. She earned her bachelor's in English and American Literature at Brown University in Rhode Island and was a Knight Foundation Journalism Fellow at Yale Law School where she received her master's degree in law. Bach was the recipient of an Echoing Green Fellowship in 2011 and earned her Juris Doctor from Stanford Law School in 1998. 

She has also received fellowships from Soros Media, the Radcliffe Institute for Advanced Study, and a special J. Anthony Lucas citation. Bach is a member of the New York bar, and has taught as an adjunct professor at the University of Rochester.

In 2020, Bach was awarded the Dial Fellowship, named after a journal founded by Ralph Waldo Emerson and funded by Laurene Powell Jobs, through the Emerson Collective, a social change organization.

Career 
Bach worked as a freelance journalist, writing for The New York Times, The Nation, Slate (magazine), The American Lawyer, and New York Magazine. 

In 2001, Bach wrote an article titled "Justice on the Cheap," published in The Nation. Chronicling the story of Tasha McDonald and her difficulty in the Georgia court system, it was then, when she began looking closely into the plight of people and how they were treated in the criminal court system. Bach, who spent eight years investigating the failure of the courts, and utilizing her background as an attorney and journalist, wrote her book, Ordinary Justice, which was published in 2009. 

In 2010, part of an essay, published in The Crime Report, and adapted from a lecture in February 2010, Bach recalled:

After the publication of her book, Anthony Lewis of the New York Review of Books noted that "Bach has done something different: shown us the reality of the criminal justice process in microscopic, human detail. In different places across the country she watched went on in courtrooms. Her accounts of what she saw should open others' eyes to unwelcome reality. It is a revealing and important book," and the Milwaukee Journal Sentinel wrote that the book "Should be required reading for every judge, prosecutor, defense lawyer, clerk and defendant in courthouses everywhere."

in 2011, following the publication of her book, Bach Founded Measures for Justice, a nonprofit that collects and publishes county-level criminal justice performance data, where she serves as the Executive director.

Awards and recognition 

 2005 Finalist Anthony Luckas Work-In-Progress Award, Columbia University Graduate School of Journalism.
2009 Green Bag Journal Award, for Exemplary Legal Writing in her book, Ordinary Injustice: How American Holds Court.
2010 Robert F. Kennedy Book Award, for Ordinary Injustice: How American Holds Court.
2018  The Academy of Criminal Justice Science's Leadership and Innovation Award.
2018 Charles Bronfman Prize for young humanitarians.

Personal 
Bach is married to John Markman, a doctor at the University of Rochester Medical Center. They have one son. They reside in Rochester, New York.

References

External links 
 Reviews of Ordinary Injustice
 

Stanford Law School alumni
Brown University alumni
1968 births
21st-century American writers
21st-century American women writers
Living people
Chapin School (Manhattan) alumni